Kristopher Jon Gilchrist (born 3 December 1983) is a Scottish competitive swimmer and breaststroker who has represented Great Britain in the Olympics, FINA world championships and European championships, and Scotland in the Commonwealth Games.  He is a past world champion in the 200-metre breaststroke.

At the 2008 Summer Olympics in Beijing, he competed in the 100- and 200-metre breaststroke events.  At the 2008 FINA short-course world championship, he won a gold medal in the men's 200-metre breaststroke.

Personal bests and records held

External links
British Olympic Association athlete profile
British Swimming athlete profile

Scottish male swimmers
Olympic swimmers of Great Britain
Swimmers at the 2008 Summer Olympics
Living people
1983 births
Medalists at the FINA World Swimming Championships (25 m)
European Aquatics Championships medalists in swimming
Commonwealth Games medallists in swimming
Commonwealth Games bronze medallists for Scotland
Swimmers at the 2006 Commonwealth Games
Male breaststroke swimmers
Medallists at the 2006 Commonwealth Games